Frances Laura Spencer-Churchill, Duchess of Marlborough (née Charteris; 10 August 1915 – 19 February 1990), was a British noblewoman and socialite. She was variously Viscountess Long, Countess of Dudley and became Duchess of Marlborough upon her fourth marriage, to John Spencer-Churchill, 10th Duke of Marlborough. She was the sister of novelist Hugo Charteris and Ann Charteris (who married Ian Fleming), as well as the granddaughter of Hugo Charteris, 11th Earl of Wemyss. Her third husband, Michael Temple Canfield, was the former husband of Lee Radziwill, sister of Jacqueline Kennedy Onassis. During World War II, she served as an auxiliary nurse.

Early life
Frances Laura Charteris was born on 10 August 1915 at London, England, to Captain the Hon. Guy Lawrence Charteris (second son of the 11th Earl of Wemyss and Mary Constance Wyndham) and Frances Lucy Tennant, daughter of a Scottish chemical merchant. Laura, as she was called, had 3 siblings, Ann, Mary Rose and Hugo. Their mother died of cancer in 1925 and the remainder of their childhood was spent shuffling between homes in London and family in Scotland, where their grandparents, the Earl and Countess of Wemyss, lived. During World War II, she served as an auxiliary nurse for the Royal Navy.

Marriages
On 14 November 1933, at St Margaret's Church, Westminster, London, England, she married Walter Francis David Long, 2nd Viscount Long. He was the son of Brigadier-General Walter Long and 
Sibell Vanden-Bempde-Johnstone. During her marriage, she was the Viscountess Long. Laura's only child, was the product of this union: The couple divorced in 1942.

 Antoinette Sara Frances Sibell Long (b. 1934), who married the Hon. Sir Charles Morrison, second son of John Morrison, 1st Baron Margadale, in 1954.

Laura then married William Humble Eric Ward, 3rd Earl of Dudley, son of William Humble Ward, 2nd Earl of Dudley and Rachel Gurney, on 23 February 1943. She was known as the Countess of Dudley until she and Ward divorced in 1954.

On 13 June 1960, Laura married Michael Temple Canfield, rumoured to have been the son of Prince George, Duke of Kent and American socialite Alice Gwynne Preston. Canfield was adopted as an infant by Cass Canfield, head of Harper & Row Publishing house with his wife Katharine Emmet. Michael Canfield was the previous husband of Lee Radziwill, Jackie Kennedy's younger sister. 
  
Her fourth and final husband was John Albert William Spencer-Churchill, 10th Duke of Marlborough, whom she married six weeks before his death in 1972. From the time of this marriage, she became known as the Duchess of Marlborough.

Laura died on 19 February 1990 at age 74 at Portman Towers, Marylebone, London, England.

Autobiography
In 1980, she published her autobiography, Laughter from a Cloud. London: Weidenfeld and Nicolson, 1980

Titles
1915 — 1933: Miss Frances Laura Charteris
1933 — 1942: The Right Honourable The Viscountess Long
1942 — 1943: Frances, Viscountess Long
1943 — 1954: The Right Honourable The Countess of Dudley
1954 — 1960: Frances, Countess of Dudley
1960 — 1971: Mrs Michael Temple Canfield
1972 — 1972: Her Grace The Duchess of Marlborough
1972 — 1977: Her Grace Laura Spencer-Churchill, Duchess of Marlborough 
1977 — 1990: Her Grace The Dowager Duchess of Marlborough

References 

1915 births
1990 deaths
Women autobiographers
English socialites
Laura
20th-century British women writers
20th-century British non-fiction writers
English autobiographers
Long
Dudley
Marlborough
Laura